Julian Sargeant "Sarge" Reynolds (June 30, 1936 – June 13, 1971) of Richmond, Virginia was an American teacher, businessman, and Democratic politician. He served in both the House and Senate of the Virginia General Assembly and served as 30th Lieutenant Governor of the Commonwealth of Virginia under Governor Linwood Holton. He died of an inoperable brain tumor at age 34, while in office as Virginia's Lieutenant Governor.

Early and family life
Reynolds was born into wealth in New York City, the second son of Richard Samuel Reynolds, Jr. (president and CEO of Reynolds Metals Company), and Virginia McDonald Sargeant Reynolds. His grandfather had invented Reynolds Wrap and founded the metals company. His great-grandfather A.D. Reynolds of Bristol, Tennessee had been a successful tobacco farmer and brother of Richard Joshua Reynolds, who founded the R.J. Reynolds Tobacco Company.

Sarge Reynolds was educated in Richmond, Virginia, graduating from St. Christopher's School in 1947, and from Woodberry Forest School in Orange, Virginia in 1954. He then went to Philadelphia, Pennsylvania to attend the Wharton School of Finance, University of Pennsylvania. In 1958 he graduated 9th in his class of 356.

He married the former Elizabeth (Betsy) Weir Veeneman of Louisville, Kentucky. Before their divorce, they had four children: Virginia (Ginny) Weir, J. Sargeant, Jr., Jeanne Elizabeth (Liz) and David Parham Reynolds II (who died less than 2 months after birth). Reynolds then married Mary Ballou Handy Stettinius from Lynchburg, Virginia. They had one son, Richard Roland Reynolds.

Career
In 1958 Reynolds started his business career in the Market Research Department of the family's Reynolds Metals Company. In 1961 he became Assistant Treasurer and in 1965 he became Executive Vice-President of the Reynolds Aluminum Credit Corporation. He also taught economics at the University of Richmond to help him overcome shyness.

Political career
Reynolds began his political career with the Young Democratic Club, as the Byrd Organization struggled with the end of Massive Resistance. Reynolds first ran for elective office in 1965 and was elected as one of eight delegates for Richmond. In that election after the reapportionment required by Davis v. Mann as well as the Civil Rights Act of 1965, incumbents George E. Allen Jr., T. Coleman Andrews Jr., Harold H. Dervishian, Junie L. Bradshaw and Edward E. Lane won re-election, and Reynolds, E. B. Pendleton Jr. and T. Dix Sutton replaced fellow Democrat Fred G. Pollard (who became Lieutenant Governor) as well as Richmond's first elected Republicans in years--Louis S. Herrink Jr. (who moved to King George) and S. Strother Smith Jr. (each of whom had been elected in 1963 and proved one-termers).

Two years later, Reynolds ran for the Virginia State Senate from District 30, again representing Richmond City, Senator FitzGerald Bemiss having retired. Reynolds and incumbent fellow-Democrat Edward E. Willey thus became Richmond's two senators. In the General Assembly, Reynolds advocated establishing the Virginia Community College System. In the 1967 election at which Reynolds moved up to the state senate, among Richmond's eight delegates, half changed. Thomas P. Bryan, Ernest W. Farley Jr., William Ferguson Reid and Richmond's first woman mayor, Republican Eleanor Parker Sheppart replaced Andrews, Dervishian, Reynolds and Sutton.

Virginia's Democratic Party nominated Reynolds to run for Lieutenant Governor against pro-education Republican H. Dunlop Dawbarn in 1969, which proved to be a near-landslide year for Republicans. The Republicans concentrated their efforts on electing Richard Nixon President and Linwood Holton Virginia's governor (who outpolled Democrat William C. Battle), and succeeded with many other offices on the ticket. However, Reynolds broke the tide, polling 54% of the vote for lieutenant governor compared to Dawbarn's 42%, thus winning the 3-way race. In a 1969 special election following Reynolds' resignation from the State Senate, fellow Democrat L. Douglas Wilder (who would later become Virginia's first African-American governor) won election to represent Richmond in the state senate alongside Willey, thus replacing Reynolds.

Death and legacy

Shortly after taking office, Reynolds was diagnosed as having an inoperable brain tumor. Weakened by attempted treatments of the tumor in New York City, Reynolds died of pneumonia. Reynolds asked to be buried at his great-grandfather's boyhood home. Dying in office, he was accorded a state funeral before being buried in accordance with that wish. J. Sargeant Reynolds Community College, which serves Henrico County and metropolitan Richmond, was named in his honor after his death in 1971.

References

Further reading

The book, "Sarge Reynolds – In the Time of His Life" by Andy McCutcheon and Michael P. Gleason, published in 1996. Both men worked for and knew Sargeant Reynolds personally.

"Sarge Reynolds, a documentary" paid for by the Richard S. Reynolds Foundation (his grandfather) in cooperation with the Center for Politics at the University of Virginia, 2006.

External links 
J. Sargeant Reynolds Community College

1936 births
1971 deaths
20th-century American businesspeople
20th-century American politicians
Deaths from brain tumor
Lieutenant Governors of Virginia
Democratic Party members of the Virginia House of Delegates
Politicians from New York City
Politicians from Richmond, Virginia
Reynolds family
St. Christopher's School (Richmond, Virginia) alumni
Democratic Party Virginia state senators
Wharton School of the University of Pennsylvania alumni
Woodberry Forest School alumni